Chaetostoma palmeri is a species of catfish in the family Loricariidae. It is native to South America, where it occurs in the Tamana River basin in the San Juan River drainage in Colombia. The species reaches 9.5 cm (3.7 inches) in total length.

References 

palmeri
Fish described in 1912